Pokémon Sleep is an upcoming sleep-tracking app for Android and iOS. It is scheduled to be released worldwide, excluding certain regions, in summer 2023.

Development 
Pokémon Sleep is being developed by Japanese studio Select Button, with assistance by Pokémon Go developer Niantic, and is going to be published by The Pokémon Company. It was announced on May 28, 2019, by Tsunekazu Ishihara, CEO of the Pokémon Company, during a press conference held in Tokyo as well as on the company's official Twitter page. The game was planned to be released in 2020, but remained unreleased, leading to speculation that the app was cancelled. However, on 5 April 2021, a fan reported on Twitter that an SSL certificate had been registered for eotxawxn.sleep.pokemon.co.jp.

A Pokémon Go APK data mine in January 2022 revealed several additions to the Pokémon Go app to support Pokémon Sleep, including support for the Pokémon Go Plus accessory, reviewing sleep patterns, and earning in game rewards. These were confirmed by the Pokémon Day 2023 Pokémon Presents, in which they officially announced the Pokémon Go Plus + (Plus Plus) Accessory.

On February 27, 2023, Pokémon Sleep was showcased during the Pokémon Presents along with an official release date of summer 2023, along with connectivity with the upcoming Pokémon GO Plus+.

Gameplay 
The game tracks the amount of time a user sleeps, using the accelerometer of the external Pokémon Go Plus+ accessory, and communicates the data to the user's mobile device via Bluetooth for sleep-related gameplay. Although the gameplay specifics have not been revealed, The Pokémon Company has promised it will turn "sleeping into entertainment" in a similar way to how the Pokémon franchise's other mobile games, Pokémon Go and Pokémon Smile, turned walking and oral hygiene into entertainment respectively. The Pokémon Go Plus + (Plus Plus) Accessory functions by pressing a button when you sleep, then wake up. It features Pikachu voicelines, including a lullaby sung by Pikachu.

References 

 

Upcoming video games scheduled for 2023
Android (operating system) games
IOS games
Niantic, Inc. games
Sleep
Video games developed in Japan
Video games developed in the United States